The 1994–95 season was Cardiff City F.C.'s 68th season in the Football League. They competed in the 24-team Division Two, then the third tier of English football, finishing twenty-second, suffering relegation to Division Three.

After three months of the season, manager Eddie May was sacked from his position and replaced by Terry Yorath. However Yorath's spell in charge saw the side plummet to the bottom of the table and Yorath was also sacked and remarkably replaced by the man he took over from in Eddie May.

Players 

First team squad.

Standings

Results by round

Fixtures and results

Second Division

Source

League Cup

FA Cup

Welsh Cup

Auto Windscreens Shield

See also 
List of Cardiff City F.C. seasons

References

Further reading 

Welsh Football Data Archive

1994-95
Welsh football clubs 1994–95 season
1994–95 Football League Second Division by team